Yabba South is a locality in Victoria, Australia. The locality is in the southern part of the Shire of Moira. The former Katamatite Tramway ran through Yabba South.

Yabba post office opened in 1902 and was closed on 15 March 1908.

References

Towns in Victoria (Australia)
Shire of Moira